The U.S. 500 was an automobile race sanctioned by CART, it was held at Michigan International Speedway in Brooklyn, Michigan. The event was held from 1973 to 1986 and again in 1996 due to the event being known as the as an alternative to the 1996 Indianapolis 500.

Racing History

1973-1986
Michigan was given a second date in 1973 and chose to do it as twin 125 mile races. The twin race format was axed in 1974 and it dropped USAC for CART in 1979, Michigan kept its second date till 1986.

1996 Revial

For the 1996 CART season, it was the first of two events at Michigan, the second being the traditional Marlboro 500 in July.

Tony George, owner of the Indianapolis Motor Speedway, formed the Indy Racing League as an alternative to CART. While the Indianapolis 500 had continued to be sanctioned by the United States Auto Club (USAC) since the formation of CART in 1979, CART teams and drivers represented the vast majority of the Indy field, and USAC had taken steps to ensure that the technical specifications for Indy did not preclude CART teams from participating. In 1996, however, following his creation of the IRL, George stipulated that 25 of the 33 starting positions at Indy would be reserved for the top 25 cars which ran events in his series. This move created potential scheduling conflicts with CART-sanctioned events.

Interpreting this policy as a lockout of CART teams, the CART board agreed to stage the U.S. 500 at an alternative venue on Memorial Day weekend, the traditional date for the Indianapolis 500. George, on the other hand, viewed the refusal of CART teams to compete for the remaining eight positions on the Indy grid as a walkout/boycott.

While the Indianapolis 500 has a history of one-off participants (teams and drivers who participate in only the single race and not in other series events), the field for the U.S. 500 were comprised almost exclusively of teams and drivers who participated in the full CART season, as CART was formed of franchises owned by the various team owners, which formed the organization in 1978. CART franchise owners were required to field teams for all races.

1996 U.S. 500

CART scheduled what was billed as a "Special Qualifying Session" for the U.S. 500 on the weekend of May 11–12, 1996. Cold temperatures and reported snow flurries hampered the session at Michigan, although it was completed as scheduled.

The move was exclusive in that all other CART events featured qualifying the same weekend of the race. Qualifying directly conflicted with the first weekend of qualifying for the Indianapolis 500. The move effectively prevented teams potentially competing at both events from having hopes of qualifying for the pole position at both races. Teams would return two weeks later for the race.

Jimmy Vasser won the first such race in 1996, which was notable for its disastrous start. With the cars lined up in rows of three (the traditional starting formation of the Indy 500), Vasser, on pole, was about to take the green flag at the start, when he was struck by Adrian Fernandez. Fernandez then tagged Bryan Herta, and the resulting accident took out a number of cars.  Though ten cars had wrecked out, CART allowed teams to bring out backup cars and make repairs to heavily-damaged cars; this hurt the credibility of CART for allowing what normally would have been DNFs to come back out as though nothing had happened; years earlier Roberto Guerrero, the polesitter for the 1992 Indianapolis 500, crashed on the pace lap and was ruled a DNF.

With the victory, Vasser won over $1 million and had his likeness inscribed onto the Vanderbilt Cup. In addition, an American flag was waved along with the twin checkered flags to end the race.

Demise
Following the 1996 season, CART decided not to run the U.S. 500 opposite the Indianapolis 500 again. The race, as it had been initially created, was discontinued. The success of the event was questionable, and the remaining reasons to hold the event were the subject of considerable debate. Teams and officials also were not keen on racing at the same facility twice in the same season. From 1997 to 1999, instead of creating a direct conflict with the Indianapolis 500, CART instead scheduled a race at the newly opened Gateway International Speedway (the Motorola 300) as its Memorial Day weekend alternative. This race, however, experienced much less interest, and was eventually moved to August.

Starting in 1997, the IRL adopted new chassis and engine rules that were not compatible with the equipment used by CART teams; thus any CART teams choosing to race at Indianapolis would have to purchase all-new cars compatible with IRL rules. After experiencing unforeseen problems unrelated to the CART boycott, the IRL dropped its 25/8 restriction for the Indianapolis 500 after the 1997 race. No CART team, however, would return to Indianapolis until 2000.

Also in 1997, Penske Corporation and CART added a season-ending race at California Speedway. As a result, some name-shuffling ensued. The Marlboro 500 name, which had been used for the 500-mile event held at Michigan in July or August from 1987 to 1996, was transferred to the new California Speedway race. The U.S. 500 name was, in turn, given to the annual summer Michigan race, now being held in July, from 1997 to 1999.

In the 1998 race, three spectators were killed and six more injured when a wheel from Adrian Fernández's car flew into the grandstands during a crash on lap 175 of the 250 lap race.  CART was widely criticized for not stopping the race in deference to the dead and injured fans, though races in previous years were not stopped despite fatalities.  CART's own investigation determined that the casualties were the result of an "accidental racing incident."  However, the track's fences were quickly extended by an additional four feet in an attempt to contain debris from future crashes.

In 2000, the U.S. 500 name was dropped permanently as the race was changed to the Michigan 500 presented by Toyota, and in its last year, 2001, it was known as the Harrah's 500. In 2002, the race switched alliances to the Indy Racing League, and became what was known as the Firestone Indy 400.

Past winners

1981: Race shortened due to scoring error.

Race summaries

CART
1996: The open wheel "split" led the CART-based teams to hold an alternative race to the Indy 500, the U.S. 500 at Michigan on Memorial Day weekend. At the start, Jimmy Vasser, Adrián Fernández, and Bryan Herta touched wheels, and triggered a huge pileup, collecting more than half the field. The race was restarted with many teams electing to use backup cars. Several cars, including front-runners Alex Zanardi and Greg Moore suffered blown engines. Parker Johnstone also dropped out late running out of fuel. With 9 laps to go, leader André Ribeiro's car ran out of fuel, and he was forced to duck into the pits for a splash-and-go. Ribeiro's car - one of the backup cars rolled out - did not have proper working fuel telemetry, leaving the crew unsure of their fuel situation. Jimmy Vasser led the final 9 laps to victory.

References 

Champ Car races
Motorsport in Michigan